Wajahat Saeed Khan (born November 5, 1978), is a Pakistani journalist, currently working as an editor and correspondent at Nikkei Asia.

Khan has produced, reported, and anchored for Pakistan's major cable networks, as well as leading U.S., U.K., and Indian publications. Khan was a producer and correspondent for NBC News in Islamabad and Kabul, and the National Security Correspondent for Lahore-based Dunya News. He has also contributed to CNN, The Times and India Today, but is best known as the anchor and editor of the hit primetime show, Mahaaz (The Front), which he produced from 2015 till 2018.

Early life and education
Khan was born in Quetta, Balochistan to a family of civil servants. He is basically from Pashtun tribe. He attended Karachi Grammar School, where he was selected as the editor of the school magazine, The Grammarian, considered Pakistan's oldest print publication. He went on to the University of Michigan, majoring in Political Science and History, reporting and editing for The Michigan Daily on campus issues, as well as the events of 9/11. At Michigan, Khan became the only collegiate journalist to cover the US invasion of Afghanistan after the September 11 attacks. In 2011, the Harvard Kennedy School honored Khan as the first Pakistani fellow at the Shorenstein Center on Media, Politics and Public Policy, Harvard University. At Harvard, Khan authored one of the first studies tracking hate content on Pakistani social media.

Career
Khan's broadcast career started after his return from Michigan, when electronic media was deregulated in Pakistan in the early 2000s by the regime of General (retired) Pervez Musharraf. He joined the country's largest media house, the Jang Group of Newspapers/Geo News, as Manager of News Product Development and Strategy before switching to news production. Khan was at Geo News, the country's primary cable news network, from 2003 to 2007. He then helped launch Dawn News, Pakistan's first English-based news network, in 2007. At Dawn, his broadcast career effectively took off with the hit interview series Talk Back; he also became the first Pakistani to produce an investigative interview series from India for Talk Back: Eye on India. Pivoting to documentaries, Khan produced the first independent documentary series on the Pakistani military, "We Are Soldiers", which was eventually banned by Pakistan Electronic Media Regulatory Authority. He remained at Dawn until 2010.

In 2011, Khan was nominated as a Goldsmith Fellow by the Shorenstein Center on Media, Politics and Public Policy, Harvard University. The first Pakistani and the youngest fellow at the Shorenstein Center, Khan authored a study about the rise of militancy and hate content on Pakistani social media.

Khan did a short stint for CNN in 2011–2012 before moving on to produce and then correspond for NBC News from Islamabad, Kabul, Kathmandu, London, and New York.

From 2012 till 2013, Khan pivoted from English broadcast to Urdu, and conducted the series Ikhtilaf ["Opposition"], for Karachi-based AAJ TV. In 2013, he joined The Jang Group of Newspapers/Geo News again, but in the new capacity of the National Security Editor of Pakistan's largest media house. His writings at The News/Jang focused on the Pakistani military.

In 2015, he joined BOL Network before resigning due to the Axact scandal. He then joined Dunya News as the anchor and editor of the groundbreaking and hit field-reporting series, Mahaaz.

In 2016, Khan conducted a major investigation—"Who's Watching the Watchdogs"—unveiling the corrupt practices of officials linked to the Pakistan chapter of Transparency International. Further coverage saw him write several international opinion pieces in US publications such as the Washington Times and The Hill 

In July 2018, along with coverage of Pakistan's 10th general elections, Khan completed 200 episodes of Mahaaz. For long-form investigative pieces, he also founded The Bureau of Investigative Reporting, a not-for-profit reporting collective that pursues journalism for the public benefit and covers issues usually not covered by the mainstream media in Pakistan.

In summer 2019, before joining Columbia University's Journalism School for a master's degree in Business and Financial Reporting and moving to New York, Khan published his first book with HarperCollins—Game Changer: Being Shahid Afridi, a bestselling biography of the famous cricketer.

Books

References

1978 births
Living people
Pakistani male journalists
University of Michigan College of Literature, Science, and the Arts alumni
Harvard University alumni
Karachi Grammar School alumni
People from Quetta
Defence and security analysts in Pakistan
BOL Network people
Pakistani biographers
The Michigan Daily alumni
Male biographers